This is a list of Japanese football J3 League transfers in the winter transfer window 2016–17 by club.

Giravanz Kitakyushu

In:

Out:

Tochigi SC

In:

Out:

Nagano Parceiro

In:

Out:

Blaublitz Akita

In:

Out:

Kagoshima United F.C.

In:

Out:

Kataller Toyama

In:

Out:

Fujieda MYFC

In:

Out:

F.C. Ryukyu

In:

Out:

S.C. Sagamihara

In:

Out:

Grulla Morioka

In:

Out:

Fukushima United F.C.

In:

Out:

Gainare Tottori

In:

Out:

YSCC Yokohama

In:

Out:

Azul Claro Numazu

In:

Out:

References 

2016–17
Transfers
Japan